Justin John Champagnie (born June 29, 2001) is an American professional basketball player for the Sioux Falls Skyforce of the NBA G League. He played college basketball for the Pittsburgh Panthers.

Early life and high school career
Champagnie was born in Staten Island, New York and grew up in Brooklyn, New York and attended Bishop Loughlin Memorial High School. As a senior, he averaged 19.8 points per game and was named first team Class AA All-State. A three-star recruit, he committed to playing college basketball for Pittsburgh over offers from Cincinnati, Dayton, Seton Hall, Saint Louis and Rutgers.

College career
As a true freshman, Champagnie led the Panthers with 12.7 points and 7 rebounds per game. He was named the CBS Sports/USBWA National Freshman of the Week and the ACC Freshman of the Week after averaging 25 points and 10 rebounds in games against Notre Dame and Georgia Tech. On December 22, 2020, Champagnie was ruled out for at least six weeks after sustaining a knee injury during practice. On January 19, 2021, he recorded 31 points and 14 rebounds in a 79–73 win over Duke. At the conclusion of the regular season, Champagnie was selected to the First Team All-ACC. As a sophomore, Champagnie averaged 18 points, 11.1 rebounds, and 1.6 assists, 1.2 steals, and 1.3 blocks per game. Following the season, he declared for the 2021 NBA draft, forgoing his remaining college eligibility.

Professional career

Toronto Raptors (2021–2022)
Champagnie was projected as a late first round pick to an early second round pick in the 2021 NBA draft. After going undrafted in the 2021 NBA draft, Champagnie signed a two-way contract with the Toronto Raptors on August 7, 2021, splitting time with their G League affiliate, Raptors 905. With Scottie Barnes injured and unable to play, Champagnie was called by the Raptors to make his professional debut on November 1, 2021, scoring his first two points in the NBA on free throws in a win against the New York Knicks.

On July 14, 2022, Champagnie re-signed with the Raptors on a two-year contract. On December 29, he was waived by the Raptors.

Sioux Falls Skyforce (2023–present)
On January 10, 2023, Champagnie was claimed off waivers by the Sioux Falls Skyforce of the NBA G League.

Career statistics

NBA

|-
| style="text-align:left;"| 
| style="text-align:left;"| Toronto
| 36 || 0 || 7.8 || .463 || .357 || 1.000 || 2.0 || .3 || .2 || .1 || 2.3
|-
| style="text-align:left;"| 
| style="text-align:left;"| Toronto
| 3 || 0 || 3.7 || 1.000 || – || – || 1.3 || .3 || .0 || .0 || 2.0
|- class="sortbottom"
| style="text-align:center;" colspan="2"| Career
| 39 || 0 || 7.5 || .486 || .357 || 1.000 || 1.9 || .3 || .2 || .1 || 2.2

College

|-
| style="text-align:left;"| 2019–20
| style="text-align:left;"| Pittsburgh
| 33 || 27 || 32.9 || .421 || .262 || .777 || 7.0 || .7 || 1.1 || .8 || 12.7
|-
| style="text-align:left;"| 2020–21
| style="text-align:left;"| Pittsburgh
| 20 || 19 || 34.4 || .477 || .311 || .711 || 11.1 || 1.6 || 1.2 || 1.3 || 18.0
|- class="sortbottom"
| style="text-align:center;" colspan="2"| Career
| 53 || 46 || 33.4 || .446 || .280 || .745 || 8.5 || 1.0 || 1.1 || 1.0 || 14.7

Personal life
Champagnie's twin brother, Julian, plays professional basketball for the San Antonio Spurs. His father, Ranford, played soccer for St. John's in the mid-1990s and was a member of the 1996 national championship team.

References

External links
Pittsburgh Panthers bio

2001 births
Living people
21st-century African-American sportspeople
African-American basketball players
American expatriate basketball people in Canada
American men's basketball players
Basketball players from New York (state)
Pittsburgh Panthers men's basketball players
Raptors 905 players
Shooting guards
Small forwards
Toronto Raptors players
Twin sportspeople
American twins
Undrafted National Basketball Association players
American people of Jamaican descent